In U.S. political jargon, a smoke-filled room (sometimes called a smoke-filled back room) is an exclusive, sometimes secret political gathering or round-table-style decision-making process. The phrase is generally used to suggest an inner circle of power brokers, a cabal of the powerful or well-connected acting to make decisions without regard for the will of the larger group.

An early example of a smoke-filled room is the Boston Caucus. A report of a 1763 meeting of this group said, "selectmen, assessors, collectors, fire-wards and representatives are regularly chosen [there] before they are chosen in the town ... There they smoke tobacco till you cannot see from one end of the garret to the other."

The origin of the term was in a report by Raymond Clapper of United Press, describing rumors of the process by which Warren G. Harding was nominated at the 1920 Republican National Convention as the party's candidate for the presidential election. After many indecisive votes, Harding, a relatively minor candidate who was the junior senator from Ohio was, legend has it, chosen as a compromise candidate by Republican power-brokers in a private meeting at the Blackstone Hotel in Chicago after the convention had deadlocked.

See also
Closed session
Conspiracy
Gray eminence
Secret society
Star Chamber
Old boy network

References

Further reading

United States presidential elections terminology
Ethically disputed political practices
Decision-making